This is a list of mayors of Naters, Switzerland. The executive of Naters is the Gemeinderat. It is chaired by the Gemeindepräsident.

Naters
 
Lists of mayors (complete 1900-2013)